Ludovic Turpin (born 22 March 1975 in Laval) is a French professional road racing cyclist, who most recently competed for amateur team Vélo Club Grand Case.

Turpin was involved in a fist fight after a crash in stage six of the 2015 Tour de Guadeloupe.

Major results

2000
 4th Overall Tour Down Under
 5th Coppa Sabatini
 6th Trofeo Laigueglia
2001
 3rd Overall Giro della Provincia di Lucca
2002
 2nd Paris–Camembert
 3rd Overall Tour de l'Ain
 4th Overall Tour du Limousin
 7th Coppa Placci
2003
 1st Stage 2 Route du Sud
 4th Overall Tour de l'Ain
1st Stage 3
 7th Giro della Romagna
2004
 9th Overall Circuit de la Sarthe
1st Stage 2
2005
 1st Grand Prix de Rennes
 2nd Overall French Road Cycling Cup
 2nd Overall Tour de l'Ain
 2nd Polynormande
 4th Route Adélie
 7th Overall Four Days of Dunkirk
2006
 1st Stage 5 Critérium du Dauphiné Libéré
 5th Overall Étoile de Bessèges
 8th Paris–Camembert
2007
 2nd Overall Tour de l'Ain
 5th Overall Circuit de Lorraine
1st Stage 1
 5th Trophée des Grimpeurs
2009
 1st Stage 3 Tour de l'Ain
2010
 7th Gran Premio Bruno Beghelli
2012
 1st Overall Tour de Guadeloupe
1st Points classification
1st Stages 2b (ITT), 5 & 8b (ITT)
2013
 4th Overall Tour de Guadeloupe
1st Stages 2b (ITT) & 6
 9th Overall Tour do Rio
2014
 5th Overall Tour de Guadeloupe
2016
 9th Overall Tour de Guadeloupe
2017
 1st Stage 5 Vuelta a la Independencia Nacional
 10th Overall Tour de Guadeloupe

References

External links

Complete palmares

French male cyclists
Tour de Guadeloupe stage winners
Tour de Guadeloupe winners
1975 births
Living people
People from Laval, Mayenne
Sportspeople from Mayenne
Cyclists from Pays de la Loire